Flight 257 may refer to:

Indian Airlines Flight 257, crashed on 16 August 1991
Trigana Air Service Flight 257, crashed on 16 August 2015

0257